The Lomani Company was a concession company of the Congo Free State.
In the colonial era, the Lomami Company forced the people of the Lomami River region from Opala and Lokilo down to Ilambi to collect large amounts of rubber. The Mbole people of the region vividly described their view of the effect of this work with the phrase wando wo limolo, meaning "tax-caused loss of weight".

References

Bibliography

Belgian colonisation in Africa
History of the Democratic Republic of the Congo
Congo Free State